The 2009 FIVB Girls Youth Volleyball World Championship was held in Nakhon Ratchasima, Thailand from 3 to 12 July 2009. 16 teams participated in the tournament.

Qualification process

Pools composition

First round
All times are Thai Standard Time (UTC+07:00).

Pool A

|}

|}

Pool B

|}

|}

Pool C

|}

|}

Pool D

|}

|}

Second round

Pool E (1st–8th)

|}

|}

Pool F (1st–8th)

|}

|}

Pool G (9th–16th)

|}

|}

Pool H (9th–16th)

|}

|}

Final round

13th–16th bracket

|}

|}

|}

9th–12th bracket

|}

|}

|}

5th–8th bracket

|}

|}

|}

Championship bracket

Semifinals

|}

Bronze Medal match

|}

Gold Medal match

|}

Final standing

Individual awards

Most Valuable Player

Best Scorer

Best Spiker

Best Blocker

Best Server

Best Digger

Best Setter

Best Receiver

Best Libero

References

See also
 2009 FIVB Boys Youth World Championship

World Championship
2009 in Thai sport
Volleyball
FIVB Volleyball Girls' U18 World Championship
Nakhon Ratchasima